Akbari may refer to:

Places
 Akbari, Fars
 Akbari, Bavanat, Fars Province
 Akbari, Hormozgan

Other uses
 Akbari (surname)
 Akbari Architecture, a style of Indo-Islamic architecture
 Akbari Fort & Museum, a museum In Ajmer, Rajasthan, India

See also
 Akbar (disambiguation)
 Akhbari
 Akbarism, a branch of Sufi metaphysics based on the teachings of Ibn Arabi, who was known as Shaykh al-Akbar